Capitol (1979) was Orson Scott Card's second published book, and first foray into science fiction. This collection of eleven short stories set in the Worthing series is no longer in print.  However six of the stories have been reprinted in The Worthing Saga (1990) and one of them in Maps in a Mirror (1990).

Contents 
The short stories in this book are:

 "A Sleep and a Forgetting"
 "A Thousand Deaths" - Reprinted in Maps in a Mirror
 "Skipping Stones" - Reprinted in The Worthing Saga
 "Second Chance" - Reprinted in The Worthing Saga
 "Breaking the Game" - Reprinted in The Worthing Saga
 "Lifeloop" - Reprinted in The Worthing Saga
 "Burning"
 "And What Will We Do Tomorrow?" - Reprinted in The Worthing Saga
 "Killing Children" - Reprinted in The Worthing Saga
 "When No One Remembers His Name, Does God Retire?"
 "The Stars That Blink"

Related works
Hot Sleep
The Worthing Chronicle
The Worthing Saga

See also

List of works by Orson Scott Card
Orson Scott Card

External links
 Publication information for Capitol available from Card’s website

1979 short story collections
Short story collections by Orson Scott Card
Science fiction short story collections
Ace Books books